Francis Edward Clarke was an Irish Anglican clergyman.

Clarke was born in Armagh,  was educated at Trinity College, Dublin; and ordained in 1879. After a curacy in Kilashee, he was the incumbent at Killinagh from  1879 until 1883. He was then at Boyle from 1883; and Archdeacon of Elphin from 1904 until his death on 9 March 1910.

References 

Irish Anglicans
Archdeacons of Elphin
Alumni of Trinity College Dublin
1910 deaths